Wiktor Głazunow (born 24 October 1993) is a Polish sprint canoeist. He competed in the men's C-2 1000 metres event at the 2020 Summer Olympics.

References

External links
 

1993 births
Living people
Polish male canoeists
Olympic canoeists of Poland
Canoeists at the 2020 Summer Olympics
Place of birth missing (living people)
ICF Canoe Sprint World Championships medalists in Canadian